The tooth-billed bowerbird (Scenopoeetes dentirostris), also known as the stagemaker bowerbird or tooth-billed catbird, is a medium-sized (approximately  long) bowerbird. It is a stocky olive-brown bird with brown-streaked buffish white underparts, grey feet, a brown iris and a distinctive serrated bill. Both sexes are similar, but the female is slightly smaller than the male. It is the only member of the genus Scenopoeetes.

The tooth-billed bowerbird is endemic to the mountain forests of northeast Queensland, Australia.  Its diet consists mainly of fruits and young leaves of forest trees.

The male is polygamous and builds a display-court or "stage-type bower" (hence the alternate name stagemaker), decorated with fresh green leaves laid with their pale undersides facing up. The leaves are collected by the male by chewing through the leaf stalk and old leaves are removed from the display-court. The display-court consists of a cleared area containing at least one tree trunk used by the male for perching. Upon the approach of a female the male drops to the ground and displays.

A common species in its limited habitat and range, the tooth-billed bowerbird is evaluated as near threatened on the IUCN Red List of Threatened Species.

Notes

References
 Pizzey, G and Knight, F. (1997). "The Field Guide to Birds of Australia". Angus and Robertson. Sydney.

External links
 BirdLife Species Factsheet

tooth-billed bowerbird
Birds of Queensland
Endemic birds of Australia
tooth-billed bowerbird